Youssef Challouk (born 28 August 1995) is a Belgian footballer who plays as a midfielder for the Belgian club RWDM47 on loan from Kortrijk.

Club career
On 15 February 2022, Challouk signed a four-year contract with Kortrijk, beginning in the 2022–23 season. On 7 September 2022, Challouk moved on loan to RWDM47.

References

1995 births
Belgian sportspeople of Moroccan descent
Flemish sportspeople
Living people
Association football midfielders
Belgian footballers
K. Rupel Boom F.C. players
K.S.K. Heist players
K.M.S.K. Deinze players
K.V. Kortrijk players
RWDM47 players
Challenger Pro League players
Belgian Pro League players